CSF albumin is a measurement used to determine the levels of albumin in cerebrospinal fluid.

A closely related test, CSF total protein is a measurement used to determine the levels of protein in cerebrospinal fluid. It combines the albumin, IgG, and other proteins.

It can be useful in distinguishing among causes of Meningitis. It is more likely to be elevated in bacterial meningitis than in viral meningitis.

The upper normal range is 150 mg/dl in neonates, and 50 mg/dl in adults.

References

Body fluids
CSF tests